Jibin (Old Chinese: Eastern Han Chinese: *kɨas-pin) is the name of an ancient state in central Asia, in the area of Gandhara and the Kabul river, but the exact location of which is unknown.

Location

There are several possibilities for the location of Jibin:

 The Ancient Greeks called the Kabul River the Kōphēn, which could be transliterated as "Jibin", thereby referring to the alluvial plains of this river.
 A name of the Western Regions from the Western Han Dynasty to the early Jin Dynasty, namely Gandhara. Today, roughly equivalent to Peshawar, Pakistan.
 A name of the Western Regions during the Sui and Tang dynasties. Xuanzang's Great Tang Records on the Western Regions lists it as Kapisa. Today, this location is between Kafiristan and the lower reaches of the Kabul River.
 A name of the Western Regions during the Northern and Southern Dynasties, given by Xuanzang as Kaśmira. This is modern Kashmir.

History

Jibin was described in a dedicated section in the Book of Han, Volume 96, Part 1 (Traditions of the Western Regions).

References

Historical regions
Chinese Central Asia